Vermont Route 225 (VT 225) is a short  state highway in Grand Isle County, Vermont, United States. It runs from U.S. Route 2 (US 2) north of Alburgh and runs due north to the Canada–US border, where it becomes Quebec Route 225, from which it derives its number.  The route is entirely within Alburgh in Grand Isle County. The entirety of VT 225 is maintained by the town of Alburgh.

Route description

Vermont Route 225 is essentially a northern spur of U.S. Route 2, which approaches running northward through the town of Alburgh. US 2 turns westward towards its final approach to New York, and VT 225 begins to the north.  The route only intersects two through roads: a short former alignment of US 2 literally mere yards long, and Blair Road, a secondary road which parallels Route 225 northward to the border. Both of these intersections occur within a quarter mile of VT 225's southern terminus.  Route 225, appropriately named Border Road, runs almost directly north to the Canada–US border at the Alburgh–Noyan Border Crossing, only passing a few isolated homes along the way. Upon crossing the border into Quebec, the road becomes Quebec Route 225.

History
The length of VT 225 was  designated as part of VT 104, a highway extending from VT 15 in Cambridge north to the Canada–US border near Alburgh, by 1938. VT 104 was truncated on its northern end to St. Albans in the mid-to-late 1950s, at which time the former routing of VT 104 between Alburgh and the Canada–US border was redesignated VT 68. It was renumbered to VT 225 between 1976 and 1985 to match the designation of the highway it connected to (Quebec Route 225) in Quebec.

Major intersections

References

External links

225
Transportation in Grand Isle County, Vermont